Ennio van der Gouw (born 14 February 2000) is a Dutch professional footballer who plays as a goalkeeper for Eerste Divisie club VVV Venlo.

Career
Van de Gouw came through the youth system at FC Twente after joining them in 2014. Initially he was an outfield player before switching to goalkeeper aged 14. He signed his first contract with Twente in August 2019 for 3 seasons. He made it clear he would not be looking to sign a new contract at Twente as that was drawing to a close due to the fact he was third choice behind Lars Unnerstall and Jeffrey de Lange.
He made the switch to VVV-Venlo in June 2022, signing a contract for 2 seasons with the option of a third.

Van der Gouw made his professional debut for VVV on the 16 September 2022 in a 1-1 draw against Jong PSV in the Eerste Divisie. On 24 September 2022 van der Gouw made his first starting appearance in professional football against SC Telstar. Van der Gouw was credited with an assist when in the 96th minute of the game. VVV were trailing 1-0 and he came up to the opposition penalty area for his side’s attacking free kick. The ball came to him and he shinned it forward in the box for teammate Sven Braken to turn and score a late equaliser.

Personal life
He is the son of Raimond van der Gouw, who was a Manchester United goalkeeper when Ennio was born in Stockport, Lancashire. Ennio is also a keen piano player.

Career statistics

References

External links
 

2001 births
Living people
Dutch footballers
Association football goalkeepers
VVV-Venlo players
Eerste Divisie players
Footballers from Stockport